The Hidamari Sketch anime television series is based on the four panel manga of the same name written and illustrated by Ume Aoki. Directed by Akiyuki Shinbo and Ryōki Kamitsubo and produced by the animation studio Shaft, 12 episodes aired in Japan between January and March 2007; two additional special episodes aired back-to-back in October 2007. The story follows the daily lives of four girls—Yuno, Miyako, Hiro and Sae—attending Yamabuki Art High School and who live in the Hidamari Apartment building across the street from the school. They are later joined by two others who start living at the apartment building—Nazuna and Nori—after one year has passed in the series' internal chronology.

A second season titled Hidamari Sketch × 365 aired 13 episodes between July and September 2008. An original video animation (OVA) episode for 365 was released in March 2009, and two additional special episodes aired in October 2009. A third season titled Hidamari Sketch × Hoshimittsu aired 12 episodes between January and March 2010; two special episodes aired in October 2010. A two-episode miniseries, Hidamari Sketch x SP, aired between October and November 2011. A fourth anime season, Hidamari Sketch x Honeycomb, aired 12 episodes between October and December 2012. An OVA titled Hidamari Sketch: Sae & Hiro's Graduation Arc was released in November 2013.

The episodes of Hidamari Sketch were aired in an anachronic order with each episode taking place in a different month in the year; chronologically, the story begins in April. Episodes three and seven are the two episodes not out of order. The DVDs retained the anachronic ordering of events. This theme continues with Hidamari Sketch × 365, featuring events before, after, and between the first season's episodes. In Hidamari Sketch × Hoshimittsu, events set during Yuno's second year are told in chronological order, while events from the previous year retain the anachronic nature of the previous series. Hidamari Sketch x Honeycomb sticks to a mainly chronological order.

Overview
The first season of Hidamari Sketch is produced by Shaft and directed by Akiyuki Shinbo and Ryōki Kamitsubo. Yoshiaki Itou was the character designer, who based the designs on Aoki's original concept, and the screenplay was written by Nahoko Hasegawa. Composed by Tomoki Kikuya, the music was produced by Lantis with Toshiki Kameyama as the sound director. The series includes 12 episodes aired in Japan between January 12 and March 30, 2007 on the TBS television network. Two additional special episodes aired back-to-back on the same network on October 19, 2007.

A second season titled Hidamari Sketch × 365, directed by Akiyuki Shinbo and produced by Shaft, aired 13 episodes in Japan between July 4 and September 26, 2008 on TBS. An original video animation (OVA) episode for 365 was included on the seventh and final DVD compilation volume released on March 25, 2009. Two additional special episodes aired on the same network on October 18 and October 25, 2009. While character design and music director did not change, Nahoko Hasegawa was joined by Natsue Yoguchi on writing the screenplay for 365. A third season titled Hidamari Sketch × Hoshimittsu, directed by Akiyuki Shinbo and Ken'ichi Ishikura and produced by Shaft, aired 12 episodes in Japan between January 8 and March 25, 2010 on TBS. Two special episodes for the third season aired on the same network on October 24 and October 31, 2010. A two-episode miniseries, Hidamari Sketch x SP, aired on October 29, 2011 and November 5, 2011. A fourth anime season, Hidamari Sketch x Honeycomb, aired 12 episodes between October 5 and December 21, 2012. An OVA, titled , will be released on Blu-ray Disc and DVD on November 27, 2013.

The episodes of Hidamari Sketch were released by Aniplex in six Region 2 DVD compilation volumes between March 28 and August 22, 2007 in Japan in limited and regular editions. A single DVD volume containing the two special episodes for Hidamari Sketch was released on October 24, 2007. The episodes of Hidamari Sketch × 365 were released by Aniplex in seven DVD compilation volumes between September 24, 2008 and March 25, 2009 in Japan in limited and regular editions. A single DVD volume containing the two special episodes for 365 was released on October 28, 2009. The episodes of Hidamari Sketch × Hoshimittsu were released by Aniplex in six BD and DVD compilation volumes between March 24 and August 25, 2010 in Japan in limited and regular editions. A single BD/DVD volume containing the two special episodes for Hoshimitsu was released on October 27, 2011. A single BD/DVD volume containing the two episodes for SP was released on November 23, 2011. The episodes of Hidamari Sketch × Honeycomb were released by Aniplex in five BD and DVD compilation volumes between December 26, 2012 and April 24, 2013 in Japan in limited and regular editions.

The first season of Hidamari Sketch was licensed in North America by Sentai Filmworks and distributed by Section23 Films; a 14-episode DVD box set collection of Hidamari Sketch, including the two special episodes, was released with English subtitles on January 12, 2010. Hidamari Sketch × 365 was also licensed by Sentai Filmworks, with Section23 Films as distributor; a 16-episode DVD box set collection of 365, including the OVA and two special episodes, was released with English subtitles on April 6, 2010. Both seasons are on the Anime Network's online player.

Two pieces of theme music are used for each season: one opening theme sung by Kana Asumi, Kaori Mizuhashi, Yūko Gotō, and Ryōko Shintani, and one ending theme by Marble.

Hidamari Sketch

Specials

Hidamari Sketch × 365

Specials

Hidamari Sketch × Hoshimittsu

Specials

Hidamari Sketch x SP

Hidamari Sketch x Honeycomb

Hidamari Sketch: Sae & Hiro's Graduation Arc

Notes

References

External links
Hidamari Sketch official website 
Hidamari Sketch×365 official website 
Hidamari Sketch×Hoshimittsu official website 

Hidamari Sketch